Prisons in Ireland are one of the main forms of punishment, rehabilitation, or both for the commission of an indictable offense and other offenses.

Authority

In 1925, shortly after the establishment of the Irish Free State, Minister for Justice, Kevin O'Higgins, introduced legislation repealing the existing ability of grand juries to appoint visiting committees to prisons within the State. Instead, the authority to appoint the members of prison visiting committees was vested solely in the person of the Minister. Similarly, the management of the prison system within the  Irish Free State passed to the control of the Minister with the dissolution by statutory instrument of the General Prisons Board for Ireland (the G.P.B.) in 1928. The G.P.B. had been an all-Ireland body. Thus, by this date, both the responsibility and control over the management and oversight of the prison service within the Irish Free State was held within the Minister's department.

This situation remained unchanged until 1999 when the Minister for Justice, Equality and Law Reform, John O'Donoghue, established the Irish Prison Service to which was delegated the task of managing the day-to-day running of the prison system. Simultaneously in 1999, a Prisons Authority Interim Board was established and its members were appointed by the Minister in 2000. The purpose of this board was to advise the director general and directors of the Irish Prison Service on the management of the penal system. In 2002 the retired High Court Judge, Dermot Kinlen, was appointed the state's first Inspector of Irish Prisons. However, none of these new bodies was ever established on a statutory basis despite indications to the contrary.

In 2009, the Irish Prison Service had an annual budget of €379.319 million and it had a staff of 3,568 people.

EuroPris and the European Union 

Ireland is a member of the European Union and the EuroPris system. Being a member of this system requires abolition of the death penalty and humane prison conditions. The goal of the Europris system is to ensure cooperation between European prison systems which aims to improve the lives of prisoner and their families, growing public safety and security, and reducing the re-offending rate.

Prison services 
The Irish prison system attempts to educate inmates and give them opportunities to avoid recidivism.  The system provides multiple forms of education including vocational, life skills, basic education, healthy living, and technology education. The system also provides methamphetamine addiction treatment facilities that covers at least 80% of the Irish prison population. They also ready the inmates for reintegration and resettlement back into society and  provide mental health and health services for the inmates.

Prison population rate
As of February 2021, the prison population in Ireland was 3,729. In December 2020, the incarceration rate was approximately 73 per 100,000 inhabitants.

The proportions in the prison population are; 17.6% are pre-trial and remand prisoners, 4.2% are females, 1.0% are under the age of 18, and 13.3% of the prisoners are foreign. The maximum number of prisoners the system can handle is 4,273; the prisons in Ireland are 87.5% full. For 2017, the rates in pre-trial and female prisons both went up, the pre-trial prisoners went up to a rate of 17.6% and the female rate went up to 4.2%. The previous rates for females, 3.4% in 2015 and pre-trial prisoners was 14.6% in 2015. The remand and pre-trial rate increased by 3% and the female rate increased by 0.8%. Since 2000, the lowest population the system has had is 2,948 which was in 2000, and the highest rate was 4,318 in 2012.

Prisons and prison population

There are 12 prisons in Ireland with a total bed capacity of 4,106 as of 31 December 2009. The daily average number of prisoners in custody in 2009 was 3,881. However, most of these prisons operate at or above capacity. On 25 January 2011, the prison population stood at 4,541. There were about 80 prisoners per 100,000 inhabitants in October 2015.

Sentencing

In 2009 there were 15,425 committals to prisons in Ireland, which is an increase of 13.8% on 2008 when the equivalent figure was 13,557. 12,339 individuals accounted for all the committals in 2009. 10,865 committals to prisons in 2009 followed sentencing.

Cost of placement

The average cost to incarcerate a person in a prison in 2009 was €77,222 per annum. This was a decrease of 16.7% on the 2008 figure when the cost of incarceration was €92,717 on average.

Active prisons

 One reason Ireland has a successful recidivism programme is the educational opportunities they provide while prisoners are serving a sentence. During a sentence, an inmate has access to a wide variety of classes, as well as personal tutoring services to help them succeed in their classes. These classes include home economics, art, pottery, photography, drama and music, crafts, technology, horticulture, and lastly science programs. There are also instructional technology courses available at certain facilities. If inmates do decide to attend classes, this allows them to be excused from some of the work duties that are required by the prison each day. All of this is provided through the Department of Justice and the Irish Vocational Education Committee. To decide what classes each inmate should enroll in, each inmate goes through an interviewing process. This helps the inmates because it gives them a personalized schedule that they would not be able to make on their own. Also, students are interviewed on a weekly basis to see if they are struggling in any classes. This allows the program to be more successful because if an inmate is having any trouble in their classes it is to be assessed right away so they can get the help they need to get back on track (Literacy Work in Prison).

Minors

Formerly, children in Ireland (North and South) were detained in Industrial Schools or Reformatory Schools. Currently, within the Republic of Ireland, they are detained in institutions called Children Detention Schools. These detention schools are managed by the Irish Youth Justice Service. There are four facilities for the detention of "children", defined as boys under the age of 17 and girls under the age of 18:

 Finglas Child and Adolescent Centre Children Detention School
 Oberstown Children Detention Campus (separate boys' and girls' schools)

Defunct prisons 
 Spike Island
 Clonmel Borstal
 Geneva Barracks
 Kilmainham Gaol
 Newgate Prison, Dublin
 Richmond General Penitentiary
 Roscommon Jail (Now Stone Court Shopping Centre)
 Sligo Gaol
 The Black Dog, Dublin
 Cork City Gaol
 Cork County Gaol
 Wicklow Gaol

Statutory basis of the penal system in Ireland

  Children Act (2001)
  Criminal Justice Act (1960)
  Criminal Justice Act (1997)
  Criminal Justice Act (2000)
  Criminal Law Act (1997)
  Detention of Offenders (Castlerea) Regulations (1998)
  Detention of Offenders (Loughan House) Regulations (1973)
  Detention of Offenders (Shanganagh Castle) Regulations (1970)
  Detention of Offenders (Shelton Abbey) Regulations (1976)
  Detention of Offenders (The Curragh) Regulations (1996)
  Detention of Offenders (Training Unit) Regulations (1975)
  ECHR Bill (2001)
  General Provisions Board (1928)
  Human Rights Commission Act (2000)
  Illegal Immigrants Trafficking Act (2000)
  Immigration Act (1999)
  Immigration Act (2003)
  Immigration Act (2004)
  Medical Practitioners Act (1927)
  Non-Fatal Offences Act (1997)
  Ombudsman Act (1980)
  Ombudsman for Children Act (2002)
  Organisation of Working Time Regulations (1998)
  Prison Act (1933)
  Prison Act (1956)
  Prison Act (1970)
  Prison (Disciplinary Code for Officers) Rules (1996)
  Prisoners Temporary Release Rules (1960)
  Prisons Visiting Commitiees Act (1925
  Prisons Visiting Committees Order (1925)
  Refugee Act (1996)
  Rules for the Government of Prisons (1947)
  Rules for the Government of Prisons (1955)
  Rules for the Government of Prisons (1976)
  Rules for the Government of Prisons (1983)
  Rules for the Government of Prisons (1987)
  Safety Health and Welfare at Work Act (1989)
  Social Welfare (Social Assistance Regulations) (1993)

See also

Notes

Bibliography

External links
Irish Criminology Research Network
Irish Penal Reform Trust
Irish Prison Service
Department of Justice and Law Reform: Prisons and Probation
Prison Officers' Association